22 Tauri is a component of the Asterope double star in the Pleiades open cluster. 22 Tauri is the stars' Flamsteed designation. It is situated near the ecliptic and thus is subject to lunar occultation. The star has an apparent visual magnitude of 6.43, which is near the lower threshold of visibility to the naked eye. Anybody attempting to view the object is likely to instead see the Asterope pair as a single elongated form of magnitude 5.6. It is moving further from the Earth with a heliocentric radial velocity of +7 km/s.

This is an ordinary A-type main-sequence star with a stellar classification of A0 Vn. The 'n' suffix indicates the spectrum displays "nebulous" absorption lines due to rapid rotation. This is confirmed by a high projected rotational velocity of 232 km/s. The star is radiating six times the Sun's luminosity from its photosphere at an effective temperature of 11,817 K.

References

A-type main-sequence stars
Pleiades Open Cluster
Taurus (constellation)
Durchmusterung objects
Tauri, 022
023441
017588
1152
Sterope II